Sir David Allan "Dai" Rees, FRS (28 April 1936 – 10 June 2021) was a British biochemist and science administrator who was chief executive of the Medical Research Council between 1987 and 1996.

Early life and education
Rees was born in Silloth, Cumberland but educated in Wales: he attended Hawarden Grammar School and received his BSc and PhD degrees in chemistry from University College of North Wales, Bangor.

Career
Rees was a lecturer in chemistry at the University of Edinburgh from 1960 until 1970, researching carbohydrate conformation and structure. He then joined Unilever, where he rose to become Principal Scientist. He left in 1982 to become director of the National Institute for Medical Research before serving as chief executive of the Medical Research Council from 1987 to 1996. He was president of the European Science Foundation between 1994 and 1999.

Honours and awards
Rees received a DSc degree from the University of Edinburgh in 1969. In 1970, Rees was awarded both the Carbohydrate Chemistry Award by the Chemical Society and the Colworth Medal by the Biochemical Society. He was elected a Fellow of the Royal Society (FRS) in 1981 and delivered the Royal Society's Philips Lecture in 1984. He was knighted in the 1993 Birthday Honours. He was one of the 58 founding fellows of the Learned Society of Wales in 2010.

References

British biochemists
Fellows of the Royal Society
Knights Bachelor
People from Silloth
Alumni of Bangor University
Academics of the University of Edinburgh
Unilever people
Medical Research Council (United Kingdom) people
1936 births
2021 deaths
Fellows of King's College London